Karl, Prince of Leiningen (13 February 18982 August 1946) was a German military officer and the eldest surviving son of Emich, Prince of Leiningen. Upon his father's death in 1939, he became the sixth Prince of Leiningen.

Early life
He was born in Straßburg, German Empire (which later became part of France), as the third child and second son of Emich, Prince of Leiningen (1866–1939; son of Ernst, Prince of Leiningen and Princess Marie of Baden) and his wife, Princess Feodore of Hohenlohe-Langenburg (1866–1932; daughter of Hermann, Prince of Hohenlohe-Langenburg and Princess Leopoldine of Baden). Through his father, he was a descendant of Gustav IV Adolf of Sweden.

Marriage
He married on 25 November 1925 in Langenburg to Grand Duchess Maria Kirillovna of Russia (1907–1951), eldest child of Grand Duke Kirill Vladimirovich of Russia and his wife, Princess Victoria Melita of Saxe-Coburg and Gotha (his third cousin through descent from Princess Victoria of Saxe-Coburg-Saalfeld). Karl is descended from the son of Victoria's first marriage and Maria's descent is from the daughter of Victoria's second marriage.

They had seven children:
Emich Kyrill, Prince of Leiningen (18 October 1926 – 30 October 1991) married Duchess Eilika  of Oldenburg (second of three daughter of Nicolas Frederick William, Hereditary Grand Duke of Oldenburg) on 10 August 1950. They had four children and six grandchildren.
Prince Karl of Leiningen (2 January 1928 – 28 September 1990) married Princess Marie Louise of Bulgaria on 14 February 1957 and they were divorced on 4 December 1968. They had two sons and six grandchildren.
Princess Kira of Leiningen (18 July 1930 – 24 September 2005) married Prince Andrew of Yugoslavia on 18 September 1963 and they were divorced on 10 July 1972. They had three children and four grandchildren. 
Princess Margarita of Leiningen (9 May 1932 – 16 June 1996) married Frederick William, Prince of Hohenzollern on 5 January 1951. They had three sons and nine grandchildren.
Princess Mechtilde of Leiningen (2 January 1936 – 12 February 2021) married Karl Bauscher on 25 November 1961. They had three sons and three grandchildren.
Prince Friedrich Wilhelm Berthold of Leiningen (18 June 1938 – 29 August 1998) married Karin Göss on 9 July 1960 and they were divorced in 1962. He remarried Helga Eschenbacher on 23 August 1971. 
Prince Peter Viktor of Leiningen (23 December 1942 – 12 January 1943)

Prince of Leiningen
In 1937, he joined the Nazi Party (membership number 4.852.615), and on the death of his father in 1939, he succeeded as the sixth Prince of Leiningen. He was a prisoner of war in the Soviet Union, where he died in 1946 at Saransk.

Ancestry

Notes and sources

Queen Victoria's Descendants, New York, 1987., Eilers, Marlene A., Reference: 195

1898 births
1946 deaths
Military personnel from Strasbourg
Princes of Leiningen